The GobizKOREA is operated by Korean SBC (Small & Medium Business Corporation), a non-profit, government-funded organization established to implement government policies and programs for the growth and development of Korean Small and Medium Enterprises (SMEs). GobizKorea supports for overseas marketing and promotion of Korean small and medium sized corporations.

Main Activities
Search of Korean companies and products
Business Matching Service between Korean supplier and international buyers
Visitor Assistant Program

References

External links
 www.gobizkorea.com (official website)

Non-profit organizations based in South Korea